In basketball, a block (short for blocked shot) occurs when a defender deflects or stops a field goal attempt without committing a foul. The VTB United League's blocks title is awarded to the player with the highest blocks per game average in a given regular season.

Block leaders

References

External links
 VTB United League Official Website 
 VTB United League Official Website 

VTB United League statistical leaders